This is a list of newspapers in South Africa.

In 2017, there were 22 daily and 25 weekly major urban newspapers in South Africa, mostly published in English or Afrikaans. According to a survey of the South African Audience Research Foundation, about 50% of the South African adult population are newspaper readers and 48% are magazine readers.  Print media accounts for about 19.3% of the R34.4bn of advertising money spent in the country.

Newspapers by circulation

National publications

Beeld (in 5 of 9 provinces)
Business Day
City Press
Daily Sun
KwelaXpress
Mail & Guardian
News Everyday
Naweek Beeld
The New Age
Rapport
Soccer Laduma 
Sondag (in 6 of 9 provinces) 
The Sowetan
Sunday Independent
Sunday Sun
Sunday Times
Sunday World
The Teacher
Townpress
Vuk'uzenzele
The Zimbabwean
The Life News (South African Digital Newspaper)

Publications by province

Mpumalanga
Bulletin
DAILY SUN
Ermelo Insight/Ermelo Insig
Excelsior News
Highvelder
Kasi Express Community Newspaper
News Everyday
Ridge Times
Standerton Advertiser
Witbank News
Ziwaphi
013NEWS

Gauteng
The Rising Sun Community Newspapers - Lenasia
City Mag
The Citizen
The Fordsburg Independent Newspaper
The Joburg Times
Rekord
 Mapepeza Community Newspaper (multilingual black-owned press) 
The Jozi Chronicle
The Laudium Sun
The Lenasia Sun
Pretoria News
Pretoria News Weekend
The Saturday Star
Sowetan
Spotlight News (Gauteng Provincial monthly newspaper) 
The Star
Super Saturday Citizen 
tame TIMES
The Times
Townpress Newspaper

KwaZulu-Natal
The Daily News
Ilanga
Ilanga langeSonto
The Independent on Saturday
Isolezwe
Isolezwe ngeSonto
Isolezwe ngoMgqibelo
The Mercury
Post
The Rising Sun Community Newspapers - Chatsworth
The Rising Sun Community Newspapers - Overport
The Rising Sun Community Newspapers - North Coast
The Rising Sun Community Newspapers - Merebank
The Rising Sun Community Newspapers - Mid South Coast
Sunday Tribune
Tabloid Media
UmAfrika
Weekend Witness
The Witness
The Zululand Observer
Isambane News

Free State
Arts Ya Rona
Free State Central News
DumelangNews
Express
Free State News
Free State Sun
Free State Times
Indigo mag
Issue
The Media News
Saterdag Volksblad
The Sports Eye 
Volksblad
Vista
The Weekly

Northern Cape
Diamond Fields Advertiser (DFA)
 Postmasburg Register
 FiND iT in Kimberley (FiND iT)

Eastern Cape
Daily Dispatch and the Saturday Dispatch
Go! & Express
Grocott's Mail
I'solezwe lesiXhosa
The Herald
UD Newspaper
Weekend Post
Graaff-Reinet Advertiser

Western Cape
Breederivier Gazette
Die Burger
Die Burger Saterdag
Cape Argus
Cape Times
Daily Voice
District Mail
Drakenstein Gazette
Eikestadnuus
Helderberg Gazette
Hermanus Times
Paarl Post
Die Son
Son op Sondag
Stellenbosch Gazette
Swartland Gazette
Theewaterskloof Gazette
Vukani
Weekend Argus (Saturday edition)
Weekend Argus (Sunday edition)
Weskusnuus
Weslander
Worcester Standard

Student/university publications

The Conduit - Durban University of Technology
IRAWA Post - University of the Free State
Journalismiziko - Durban University of Technology
Die Matie - University of Stellenbosch
NMMYou - Nelson Mandela Metropolitan University
Nux - University of KwaZulu Natal
Perdeby - University of Pretoria
Speculum - Central University of Technology, Free State
UJ Observer - University of Johannesburg
Varsity - University of Cape Town
Wapad - North-West University
Vuvuzela - University of the Witwatersrand

Online only publications 

AMC
ANC Today
FiND iT
Newssnatch
Daily Maverick
The South African
The Daily VOX
EBNewsDaily
Eyewitness News
Saffarazzi News
FiND iT in Kimberley
GroundUp (news agency)
Indian Spice
Mamba Online
MatieMedia - University of Stellenbosch
Mayihlome News
SurgeZirc SA
News Everyday
Property Wheel News
The Western Cape #TheWC

Regional/community publications
These newspapers only serve small regions, towns, or communities within larger cities, or have a small circulation.

Limpopo

Mpumalanga

North West

Gauteng

KwaZulu-Natal

Free State

Northern Cape

Eastern Cape

Western Cape

Defunct
These newspapers are no longer published.

Rayton News/Nuus
The Friend
Hoofstad
 
The Lantern

New Nation
Nova
Oggendblad
Oosterlig
Rand Daily Mail
South
Sunday Express
The New Age
ThisDay
Die Transvaler
Die Vaderland
Vrye Weekblad
Weekend Mirror
The Zingari

See also
 Media of South Africa
 List of South African media
 Xhosa language newspapers
 South African Audience Research Foundation (SAARF)

References

Bibliography

External links

Contact directory: media contacts, South African Government communications
News and media, South African Government information
SAARF website
 
South Africa Newspapers and Africa News
 
 AfricaBib

South Africa
Newspapers